Parsathua is a village in Kochas block of Rohtas district in Bihar, India. As of 2011, its population was 4,762, in 719 households. It has a regular mandi and a weekly haat. Drinking water is provided by hand pump. The village's area covers an area of 167.94 hectares, of which most is farmland: 163.9 ha are under cultivation, and 159.1 are irrigated. 1.1 ha consists of permanent pastures, and 0.4 ha consists of orchards. An area of 0.9 ha is devoted to non-agricultural use.

See also 
Mahabirganj — village administratively counted under Parsathua

References 

Villages in Rohtas district